Cartaletis gracilis is a moth of the  family Geometridae first described by Heinrich Benno Möschler in 1887. It is found in Cameroon, the Democratic Republic of the Congo, Ghana and Sierra Leone.

Subspecies
Cartaletis gracilis gracilis (Ghana, Sierra Leone)
Cartaletis gracilis landbecki (Prout, 1919) (Democratic Republic of the Congo)
Cartaletis gracilis variegata (Prout, 1916) (Cameroon)

References

Moths described in 1887
Scopulini
Moths of Africa